Landon "Sonny" Cox (1938 – May 5, 2020) was an American basketball coach and jazz alto saxophonist.

Early life

Cox's mother, Helen Harris, was a singer and performed with Erskine Hawkins. He first played with The Rocks a Cincinnati-based group that backed Jackie Wilson, Jerry Butler, Solomon Burke, Lavern Baker and other soul artists. In 1955, Cox met organist Ken Prince and they began to work together around Chicago. In 1964, they formed the Three Souls with drummer Robert Shy. The group made three albums for the Argo-Cadet label.

In 1974, Cox became the baseball coach for Paul Robeson High School (Chicago, Illinois).  In 1981, he became the basketball coach at King College Prep High School, where he coached three state basketball championship teams.  In 2006, Cox was voted as one of the 100 Legends of the IHSA Boys Basketball Tournament, a group of former players and coaches in honor of the 100th. anniversary of the IHSA boys basketball tournament. Among the basketball players whom he coached at King were Marcus Liberty, Levertis Robinson, Jamie Brandon. Imari Sawyer, Rashard Griffith, Thomas Hamilton, Michael Hermon, Emmitt Lynch, Fred Sculfield, Johnnie Selvie, Marcus Cathcings and many other local Chicago sporting luminaries.

Influences
According to jazz critic Joe Segal, Cox was influenced by Earl Bostic and Charlie Parker:
"Sonny's general sound is an amalgamation of the jazz feeling (derived from a Charlie Parker spark) and a warm fuzzy throaty sound and approach influenced by the daddy of the rock altoists Earl Bostic" (liner notes of Argo 4036). He also sounds sometimes like Hank Crawford.

Discography

 The Three Souls Dangerous Dan express (Argo Records 4036)(1964)
 The Three Souls	Soul Sounds (Argo 4044) (1965)
 Sonny Cox	The Wailer (Cadet Records 765) (1966) (with Richard Evans orchestra).

References

External links 
 TOM LORD'S JAZZ DISCOGRAPHY
 The Chess Labels, Greenwood Press (Michel Ruppli, 1983)
 
  - The Three Souls

Soul-jazz saxophonists
African-American saxophonists
American jazz alto saxophonists
American male saxophonists
Jazz alto saxophonists
1938 births
2020 deaths
Musicians from Cincinnati
Musicians from Chicago
African-American basketball coaches
Cadet Records artists
21st-century American saxophonists
Jazz musicians from Illinois
Jazz musicians from Ohio
21st-century American male musicians
American male jazz musicians
Basketball coaches from Illinois
High school basketball coaches in Illinois
21st-century African-American musicians
20th-century African-American sportspeople
20th-century American saxophonists